Msus or Zawiyat Msus, also  Masous is a village in eastern Libya.

There is a road linking her to Suluq.

Msus had been a site of several battles between Italian colonial forces and Libyan resistance fighters, such as the one that took place on March 3, 1914, between the latter (withdrawing from the Battle of Sceleildima) and the former.

Notes

Cyrenaica
Populated_places in Benghazi District